Fatty acid amide hydrolase or FAAH (oleamide hydrolase, anandamide amidohydrolase) is a member of the serine hydrolase family of enzymes. It was first shown to break down anandamide in 1993. In humans, it is encoded by the gene FAAH.

Function 

FAAH is an integral membrane hydrolase with a single N-terminal transmembrane domain. In vitro, FAAH has esterase and amidase activity. In vivo, FAAH is the principal catabolic enzyme for a class of bioactive lipids called the fatty acid amides (FAAs). Members of the FAAs include:

 Anandamide (N-arachidonoylethanolamine), an endocannabinoid
2-arachidonoylglycerol (2-AG), an endocannabinoid.
 Other N-acylethanolamines, such as N-oleoylethanolamine and N-palmitoylethanolamine
 The sleep-inducing lipid oleamide
 The N-acyltaurines, which are agonists of the transient receptor potential (TRP) family of calcium channels.

FAAH knockout mice display highly elevated (>15-fold) levels of N-acylethanolamines and N-acyltaurines in various tissues. Because of their significantly elevated anandamide levels, FAAH KOs have an analgesic phenotype, showing reduced pain sensation in the hot plate test, the formalin test, and the tail flick test. Finally, because of their impaired ability to degrade anandamide, FAAH KOs also display supersensitivity to exogenous anandamide, a cannabinoid receptor (CB) agonist.

Due to the ability of FAAH to regulate nociception, it is currently viewed as an attractive drug target for the treatment of pain.

A Scottish woman with a previously unreported genetic mutation (dubbed FAAH-OUT) in her FAAH gene with resultant elevated anandamide levels was reported in 2019 to be immune to anxiety, unable to experience fear, and insensitive to pain. The frequent burns and cuts she suffered due to her hypoalgesia healed quicker than average.

A 2017 study found a strong correlation between national percentage of very happy people (as measured by the World Values Survey) and the presence of the A allele in the FAAH gene variant rs324420 in citizens' genetic make-up.

A mutation in FAAH was initially provisionally linked to drug abuse and dependence but this was not borne out in subsequent studies.

Studies in cells and animals and genetic studies in humans have shown that inhibiting FAAH may be a useful strategy to treat anxiety disorders.

Inhibitors and inactivators 

Based on the hydrolytic mechanism of fatty acid amide hydrolase, a large number of irreversible and reversible inhibitors of this enzyme have been developed.

Some of the more significant compounds are listed below;

 AM374, palmitylsulfonyl fluoride, one of the first FAAH inhibitors developed for in vitro use, but too reactive for research in vivo 
 ARN2508, derivative of flurbiprofen, dual FAAH / COX inhibitor
 BIA 10-2474 (Bial-Portela & Ca. SA, Portugal) has been linked to severe adverse events affecting 5 patients in a drug trial in Rennes, France, and at least one death, in January 2016.  Many other pharmaceutical companies have previously taken other FAAH inhibitors into clinical trials without reporting such adverse events.
 BMS-469908
 CAY-10402
 JNJ-245
 JNJ-1661010
 JNJ-28833155
 JNJ-40413269
 JNJ-42119779
 JNJ-42165279 in clinical trials against social anxiety and depression, trials suspended as a precautionary measure following serious adverse event with BIA 10-2474
 LY-2183240
 Cannabidiol
 MK-3168
 MK-4409
 MM-433593
 OL-92
 OL-135
 PF-622
 PF-750 
 PF-3845
 PF-04457845 "exquisitely selective" for FAAH over other serine hydrolases, but failed in clinical trials against osteoarthritis
 PF-04862853
 RN-450
 SA-47
 SA-73
 SSR-411298 well tolerated in clinical trials but insufficient efficacy against depression, subsequently trialled against cancer pain as an adjunctive treatment.
 ST-4068, reversible inhibitor of FAAH
 TK-25
 URB524
 URB597 (KDS-4103, Kadmus Pharmaceuticals), is an irreversible inactivator with a carbamate-based mechanism, and appears in one report as a somewhat selective, though it also inactivates other serine hydrolases (e.g., carboxylesterases) in peripheral tissues. 
 URB694
 URB937
 VER-156084 (Vernalis)
 V-158866 (Vernalis) in clinical trials for neuropathic pain following spinal injury, and spasticity associated with multiple sclerosis. Structure not revealed though Vernalis holds several patents in the area.

Inhibition and binding 

Structural and conformational properties that contribute to enzyme inhibition and substrate binding imply an extended bound conformation, and a role for the presence, position, and stereochemistry of a delta cis double bond.

Assays
The enzyme is typically assayed making use of a radiolabelled anandamide substrate, which generates free labelled ethanolamine, although alternative LC-MS methods have also been described.

Structures 
The first crystal structure of FAAH was published in 2002 (PDB code 1MT5).  Structures of FAAH with drug-like ligands were first reported in 2008, and include non-covalent inhibitor complexes and covalent adducts.

See also 
 Endocannabinoid enhancer
 Endocannabinoid reuptake inhibitor
 Monoacylglycerol lipase
 FAAH2

References

External links 
 
 Proteopedia FAAH entry - interactive structure (JMOL) of inhibitor-bound FAAH
 Fatty acid amide hydrolase (FAAH1) Human Protein Atlas

EC 3.5.1
Integral membrane proteins